I'm a Fire is the third studio album by American country music artist David Nail. It was released on March 4, 2014 via MCA Nashville. The album garnered a positive reception from critics praising the production and lyrical content synchronizing with Nail's vocal delivery. I'm a Fire debuted at numbers 3 and 13 on both the Top Country Albums and Billboard 200 charts respectively and spawned two singles: "Whatever She's Got" and "Kiss You Tonight".

Content
Nail co-wrote four of the album's eleven tracks. The album's final track is a cover of Glen Campbell's "Galveston," which Nail performs as a duet with Lee Ann Womack, "When They're Gone (Lyle County)" features harmony vocals from Little Big Town and "Brand New Day" features harmony vocals from Aubrie Sellers, Womack and Jason Sellers' daughter.

"Whatever She's Got" was released as the album's lead-off single on May 28, 2013. It became Nail's second number one single on the Billboard Country Airplay chart in February 2014, as well as his first Top 40 hit on the Billboard Hot 100. In addition, it has received a Platinum certification in the U.S. "Kiss You Tonight" was released as the second single from the album on March 3, 2014.

Critical reception

I'm a Fire received mostly positive reviews from music critics. At AllMusic, Stephen Thomas Erlewine rated the album three out of five stars, saying that "I'm a Fire [is] insinuating, not insistent. It may not deliver a knockout punch but it's not intended to be powerful; it's a grower, sounding better with repeated exposure, repeated listens revealing the craft in the songs and the subtlety in Nail's execution." Jon Freeman of Country Weekly graded the album an A−, writing that "Golden-voiced David Nail is one of those rare singers who sounds comfortable singing just about anything, so it’s to his credit that he deals in more hefty material on his third album, I’m a Fire." At Roughstock, Matt Bjorke rated the album four-and-a-half stars out of five, favorably describing the "more ‘upbeat’ and less ‘downtempo’" nature of the record. He praised album track "The Secret" as one of Nail's best songs. Taste of Country highlighted the album as a Critic's Pick and Billy Dukes complimented the lyricism, production, and Nail's ability to do heavy heartache. He listed "Burnin' Bed," "Brand New Day," and "The Secret" as the standout tracks.

Commercial performance
The album debuted at number 3 on the Top Country Albums chart and number 13 on the Billboard 200, with 23,000 copies sold in the United States, making it Nail's highest-charting album on both charts. As of June 2016, the album has sold 91,000 copies in the US.

Track listing

Personnel

 Sarah Buxton – background vocals 
 Matt Chamberlain – drums, percussion
 Eric Darken – percussion
 Jerry Douglas – dobro
 Karen Fairchild – background vocals on "When They're Gone (Lyle County)"
 Paul Franklin – steel guitar
 Jaren Johnston – background vocals
 Chris McHugh – drums, percussion
 Jerry McPherson – acoustic guitar, baritone guitar, electric guitar
 George Marinelli Jr. – electric slide guitar, acoustic guitar, electric guitar
 Gene Miller – background vocals
 David Nail – lead vocals
 Jeff Roach – keyboards
 Chris Rodriguez – background vocals
 Mike Rojas – Hammond B-3 organ, piano
 Kimberly Schlapman – background vocals on "When They're Gone (Lyle County)"
 Aubrie Sellers – background vocals on "Brand New Day"
 Jonathan Singleton – background vocals
 Phillip Sweet – background vocals on "When They're Gone (Lyle County)"
 Neil Thrasher – background vocals
 Ilya Toshinsky – banjo, bouzouki, acoustic guitar, electric guitar, mandolin
 Jimi Westbrook – background vocals on "When They're Gone (Lyle County)"
 Micah Wilshire – background vocals
 Lee Ann Womack – background vocals on "Galveston"
 Glenn Worf – bass guitar

Charts

Weekly charts

Year-end charts

Singles

References

2014 albums
David Nail albums
MCA Records albums
Albums produced by Chuck Ainlay
Albums produced by Frank Liddell